ν Pictoris, Latinized as Nu Pictoris, is a binary star system in the southern Pictor constellation. It is visible to the naked eye as a dim point of light with an apparent visual magnitude of 5.60. The system is located around 157 light years from the Sun based on parallax, and is drifting further away with a radial velocity of +7 km/s.

Hipparcos satellite astrometry showed that ν Pictoris moved in a way that was not consistent with the proper motion and annual parallax of a single star.  The unusual measurements were not readily identifiable as being due to orbital motion, and it was referred to as having a stochastic solution to its astrometry.  Later analysis derived an orbit, although nothing is known about the companion except its approximate mass and motion about the visible star.

The pair orbit each other with a period of 452 days and an eccentricity of 0.2. The primary, component A, is a metal-lined Am star with a stellar classification of A1mA3-A9. It has 2.2 times the radius of the Sun and is radiating 15 times the Sun's luminosity from its photosphere at an effective temperature of 7,733 K. The secondary, component B, has around one fourth the mass of the primary. The system is a source for X-ray emission, which is most likely coming from the companion.

References 

A-type main-sequence stars
Am stars
Astrometric binaries

Pictor (constellation)
Durchmusterung objects
045229
030342
2320